Portals is the third studio album by Arsonists Get All the Girls. It was released on July 14, 2009, through Century Media Records. In contrast to The Game of Life, Portals features a different sound and an almost completely different line-up, making guitarist Arthur Alvarez and drummer Garin Rosen the only two original members left.

Reviews for Portals were positive, and the album reached high critical acclaim. Arsonists Get All the Girls began their headlining tour in support of Portals in late 2010.

Background
Portals was written and recorded in 2009. It is the first release by the band to feature a major line-up change. Original vocalists Cameron Reed and Remi Rodburg, decided to leave during a tour, and were replaced with Jared Monette. Original bassist, Patrick Mason, died of alcohol poisoning, and was replaced with Jaeson Bardoni.

The song "In the Empyreans" is written about the death of former bassist Mason. It was written by Arthur Alvarez and Rodburg, and features guest vocals by Rodburg. The album's title track is the longest song ever recorded by the band and has been described to combine all of the sounds Portals features together.

Critical reception

The album was generally praised by reviewers, noting that the new line-up has taken the musical style in a new direction, and that the band is generally "growing up". Absolute Punk reviewer Dymytry Vance also noted that the band have changed their overall sound. He also stated that the album is "their best work to date".

Track listing

Personnel
 Arthur Alvarez – guitar
 Jaeson Bardoni – bass guitar
 Jared Monette – vocals
 Sean Richmond – keyboards
 Garin Rosen – drums
 Derek Yarra – guitar

References

Arsonists Get All the Girls albums
2009 albums
Century Media Records albums